Tajikistan national amateur freestyle wrestling athletes represents Tajikistan in regional, continental, and world tournaments and matches sanctioned by the United World Wrestling (UWW).

Olympics

World Championship

Asian Games

Asian Championships

References

Wrestling
Freestyle wrestling